Zichya is a genus of insects belonging to the family Tettigoniidae.

Species:
 Zichya alashanica Bey-Bienko, 1951 
 Zichya baranovi Bey-Bienko, 1933

References

Tettigoniidae
Ensifera genera